András is a Hungarian masculine given name, the Hungarian form of Andrew. Notable people with the name include:

 András Ádám-Stolpa (born 1921), Hungarian tennis player
 András Adorján (born 1950), Hungarian writer
 András Ágoston (21st century), Hungarian Serbian politician
 András Arató (born 1945), also known as Hide the Pain Harold, internet meme, stock photo model, and electrical engineer
 András Balczó (born 1938), Hungarian modern pentathlete
 András Baronyi (1892-1944), Hungarian swimmer
 András Báthory (1562 or 1563–1599), Prince of Transylvania
 András Beck (1911-1985), Hungarian sculptor
 András Benkei (born 1923), Hungarian politician
 András Béres (1924-1993), Hungarian footballer
 András Bethlen (1847–1898), Hungarian politician
 András Bodnár (born 1942), Hungarian water polo player
 András Botos (born 1952), Hungarian boxer
 András Csáki (born 1981), Hungarian musician
 András Debreceni (born 1989), Hungarian footballer
 András Dienes (born 1974), Hungarian footballer
 András Dlusztus (born 1988), Hungarian footballer
 András Domahidy (born 1920), Hungarian Australian novelist
 András Dombai (born 1979), Hungarian footballer
 András Fáy (1786-1864), Hungarian poet
 András Fejér (born 1955), Hungarian cellist
 András Forgács (born 1985), Hungarian footballer
 András Frank (born 1949), Hungarian mathematician
 András Fricsay (born 1942), Hungarian German actor
 András Gál (born 1989), Hungarian footballer
 András Gálfi (born 1973), Hungarian boxer
 András Gerevich (born 1976), Hungarian poet
 András Gosztonyi (born 1990), Hungarian footballer
 András Gróf, later known as Andrew Grove (1936–2016), Hungarian-born American businessman
 András Gyárfás (born 1945), Hungarian mathematician
 András Gyürk (born 1972), Hungarian politician
 András Hadik (1710-1790), Austro-Hungarian soldier
 András Hajnal (born 1931), Hungarian mathematician
 András Haklits (born 1977), Hungarian Croatian hammer thrower
 András Hargitay (born 1956), Hungarian swimmer
 András Hegedüs (1922-1999), Hungarian politician
 András Hegedűs (1950–2022), Hungarian orienteer
 András Herczeg (born 1956), Hungarian footballer
 András Hess (15th century), Hungarian chronicle
 András Horváth, Hungarian midfielder
 András Horváth (teacher) (circa 1744-1789), Hungarian Croatian educator
 András Hubik (21st century), Hungarian canoeist
 András Kaj (born 1977), Hungarian footballer
 András Kállay-Saunders (born 1985), Hungarian American singer-songwriter
 András Katona (born 1938), Hungarian water polo player
 András Keresztúri (born 1967), Hungarian footballer
 András Kern (born 1948), Hungarian actor
 András Kornai (born 1957), Hungarian mathematical linguist
 András Kürthy (21st century), Hungarian opera director
 András Kuttik (1896-1970), Hungarian footballer
 András László (born 1976), Hungarian footballer
 András Ligeti (born 1953), Hungarian violinist
 András Littay (1884-1967), Hungarian general
 András Pál (born 1985), Hungarian footballer
 András Pándy (born 1927), Hungarian Belgian serial killer
 András Paróczai (born 1956), Hungarian runner
 András Perczel (born 1959), Hungarian professor of chemistry at the Hungarian Academy of Sciences
 András Peter (21st century), Hungarian canoeist
 András Pető (1893-1967), Hungarian educator
 András Petőcz (born 1959), Hungarian writer
 András Rajna (born 1960), Hungarian canoeist
 András Róna-Tas (born 1931), Hungarian historian
 András Sallay (born 1953), Hungarian figure skater
 András Sárközy (born 1941), Hungarian mathematician
 András Schiff (born 1953), Hungarian British pianist
 András Schiffer (born 1971), Hungarian jurist
 András Sike (born 1965), Hungarian wrestler
 András Simon (born 1990), Hungarian footballer
 András Simonyi (born 1952), Hungarian ambassador
 András Sütő (1927-2006), Hungarian Romanian writer
 András Szántó (born 1946), Hungarian American sociologist
 András Székely (1909-1943), Hungarian swimmer
 András Szente (born 1939), Hungarian canoeist
 András Szőllősy (1921-2007), Hungarian composer
 András Tölcséres (born 1974), Hungarian footballer
 András Toma (1925-2004), Hungarian soldier
 András Törő (born 1940), Hungarian American canoeist
 András Törőcsik (born 1955), Hungarian footballer
 András Tóth (footballer, born 1949), Hungarian footballer
 András Tóth (footballer, born 1973), Hungarian footballer
 András Vasy (born 1969), American-Hungarian mathematician
 András Visky (born 1957), Hungarian Romanian poet
 András Wanié (1911-1976), Hungarian swimmer
 Gergely András Molnár (1897-2006), Austro-Hungarian soldier

See also
 Andras (given name)

Hungarian masculine given names